Dianne Chandler (born December 31, 1946, in Berwyn, Illinois) is an American model who served as both a Playboy Playmate of the Month and as a Playboy Bunny. She was Miss September 1966; her centerfold was photographed by Pompeo Posar.

See also
 List of people in Playboy 1960–1969

References

External links
 
 

1946 births
Living people
People from Berwyn, Illinois
1960s Playboy Playmates